There are three species of lizard named Amazon racerunner:
 Ameiva ameiva
 Ameiva atrigularis
 Ameiva praesignis

Reptile common names